The Governor Fortunato F. Halili Avenue or simply the Governor Halili Ave, is a two-to-four lane national road and one of the major thoroughfares of the city of San Jose del Monte and the municipalities of Santa Maria and Bocaue in Bulacan, Philippines, named after the former governor of Bulacan. Many establishments are located along this 6-kilometer road.

Route description
Halili Avenue starts at the MacArthur Highway in the municipality of Bocaue in Bulacan. Its first major junction was the North Luzon Expressway or NLEx. It enters Santa Maria after the NLEx-Bocaue junction. It was bisected near the Santa Maria bridge and continues as Santa Maria -Tungkong Mangga Road. It enters San Jose del Monte after a few meters. It terminates at Del Monte-Norzagaray Road in San Jose del Monte.

References

Notes

Roads in Bulacan
Santa Maria, Bulacan